The Last Trail may refer to:

 The Last Trail, a 1909 novel by Zane Grey
 The Last Trail (1921 film), an American western film
 The Last Trail (1927 film), an American western film adaptation of Grey's novel
 The Last Trail (1933 film), an American western remake of the 1927 film